Dorothy "Dot" Germain (born May 21, 1947) is an American professional golfer who played on the LPGA Tour. She is the niece of the amateur golfer Dorothy Germain Porter.

Germain won once on the LPGA Tour in 1980.

Professional wins

LPGA Tour wins (1)

LPGA Tour playoff record (0–1)

References

External links

American female golfers
LPGA Tour golfers
Southern Illinois University Carbondale alumni
University of North Carolina at Greensboro alumni
1947 births
Living people
21st-century American women